AMCP (Academy of Managed Care Pharmacy) is a professional organization representing the interests of pharmacists who practice in managed care settings. It publishes the Journal of Managed Care & Specialty Pharmacy.

References

Pharmacy organizations in the United States
Pharmacy-related professional associations
Organizations established in 1988
1988 establishments in the United States